The 2013 Purdue Boilermakers football team was an American football team that represented Purdue University during the 2013 NCAA Division I FBS football season. The Boilermakers competed in the Leaders Division of the Big Ten Conference, and played their home games at Ross–Ade Stadium in West Lafayette, Indiana. Purdue was led by head coach Darrell Hazell, who was in his first season.

Purdue finished the season with a 1–11 record, 0–8 in Big Ten play, to finish in sixth place in the Leaders Division, failing to qualify for a bowl game. The team was the first Purdue team to go winless in conference play since the 1993 Purdue Boilermakers football team.

Recruiting

Position key

Recruits
Purdue's recruiting class was ranked No. 57 by Scout No. 56 by Rivals and No. 50 by ESPN. The program received 23 letters of intent on National Signing Day, February 6, 2013. On June 13, Purdue signee, TyVel Jemison, decided to not attend Purdue and choose to enroll at Grand Valley State.

Schedule

Roster

References

Purdue
Purdue Boilermakers football seasons
Purdue Boilermakers football